The High Commissioner of the United Kingdom to Trinidad and Tobago is the United Kingdom's foremost diplomatic representative in the Republic of Trinidad and Tobago.

Countries belonging to the Commonwealth of Nations exchange High Commissioners rather than Ambassadors. Though there are a few technical differences (for instance, whereas Ambassadors present their diplomatic credentials to the host country's head of state, High Commissioners are accredited to the head of government), in practice they have the same function.

Trinidad and Tobago were British colonies from 1802 to 1964, when the combined country gained independence from Britain and joined the Commonwealth.

From 1974 until 1980, the British High Commissioner to Trinidad and Tobago also served as non-resident High Commissioner to Grenada.

List of heads of mission

High Commissioners to Trinidad and Tobago
Sir Norman E. Costar, 1962–1966
Sir G. Peter Hampshire, 1966–1970
Roland Hunt, 1970–1973
Christopher E. Diggines, 1973–1974

High Commissioners to Trinidad and Tobago and Grenada
Christopher E. Diggines, 1974–1977
Henry S.H.C. Stanley, 1977–1980

High Commissioners to Trinidad and Tobago
David N. Lane, 1980–1985
Sir Martin S. Berthoud, 1985–1991
Brian Smith, 1991–1994
Richard A. Neilson, 1994–1996
L. Gregory Faulkner, 1996–1999
Peter G. Harborne, 1999–2004
Ronald P. Nash, 2004–2007
Eric Jenkinson, 2007–2011
Arthur Snell, 2011–2014
Charles Moore (chargé d'affaires), 2014–2015
Tim Stew, 2015-2020

Harriet Cross, September 2020-

References

External links 
UK and Trinidad and Tobago, gov.uk

Trinidad and Tobago
 
United Kingdom High Commissioners